The Gypsy Baron is a 1927 German silent adventure film directed by Frederic Zelnik and starring Lya Mara, Michael Bohnen, and William Dieterle. It is based on the storyline of the operetta The Gypsy Baron.

The film's sets were designed by André Andrejew and Alexander Ferenczy.

Cast

References

External links

1920s historical adventure films
German historical adventure films
Films of the Weimar Republic
German silent feature films
Films directed by Frederic Zelnik
Films based on operettas
Films set in Hungary
Films set in Romania
Films about Romani people
German black-and-white films
1927 adventure films
Silent historical adventure films
1920s German films
1920s German-language films